Koniusza  is a village in Proszowice County, Lesser Poland Voivodeship, in southern Poland. It is the seat of the gmina (administrative district) called Gmina Koniusza.

The village has a population of 260.

References

Villages in Proszowice County
Kielce Governorate
Kielce Voivodeship (1919–1939)